St. Mary's Church, Southampton, is a Church of England parish church, and the largest church in the port city of Southampton on the south coast of England. It is the mother church of this city with its forerunners spanning back to the first Saxon settlements of the 7th century, including a major collegiate church of the European Middle Ages dedicated to the same patron saint. Its name has been used nearby for major street names and in St Mary's Stadium, the city's largest sports stadium. Parts of the church date to the 1880s.

In 1914 the sound of its church bells inspired the song "The Bells of St. Mary's", originally recorded in 1919 by Frances Alda and later sung by Bing Crosby in a film of the same name.

Listed building, medieval-style architecture and George Edmund Street
The church has listed building status expressly due to its church tower and spire being local landmarks. Close to the bombed dockworker's terraces, the interior and walls were gutted in the Second World War and rebuilt in 1954–6 save for the tower with steeple designed by acclaimed church architect George Edmund Street and its small baptistery also of  1880 which has a little stained glass by Clayton and Bell. Other craftsmanship in the medieval revival style are reredos depicting the Nativity by Thomas Earp. Its stone-buttressed heavy nave is built of ashlar limestone topped by a slate roof. Its tower has three stages; the upper a broached spire with lucarnes (dormers)s added in 1914, fulfilling Street's wider plans.

Location
The church stands a few hundred metres east of the high street occupying its own green site at the south end of St. Mary street on the east side. Its grounds also line the north side of Chapel Road. Buildings of Southampton City College are north and east. Urban planners have kept the surroundings low-rise to blend with its quiet green oasis which includes large deciduous trees. The legal protection of the listing of the building, reads: "included for fine tower and steeple which are also a local landmark".

History
The present church is the sixth on the site of the Saxon town of Hamwic (Hamtun).

First church
The first church at Hamwic is thought to have been built around AD 634 when Saint Birinus arrived at the port on his mission to re-convert England to its former Christian faith. About this time, the first small church of St. Mary was built on the present site. During the Viking raids of 994, Olaf I of Norway is believed to have worshipped at the church while camped at Woolston prior to his return to Norway.

The first recorded priest and holder of the benefice was named as Richerius (1086). In the Domesday Book, it is stated that the church is "held by Richerius thd(sic) Clerk, with two other churches near Southampton, dependent on it as the mother-church, and Richerius owns in right of his benefice all the tithes of the town of Southampton and also of Kingsland".

The Saxon town survived many invasions and ravages by the Danes but eventually fell into decline and in the time of King Canute in the 11th century the population moved to the safety of the Norman medieval settlement to the west, with St. Michael's Church being first built in 1070. However, St. Mary's continued to be of significant importance as the mother church, with its claims to tithes, burial rights and privileges reflecting its status. A document of 1281 appears to confirm the status of St. Mary's as a collegiate church and as the principal church of Southampton.

Second church
In the 12th century, the church was rebuilt on the instruction of Queen Matilda (the wife of King Henry I), on account of its poor and inadequate state. This, the second church, known as "The great church of Our Lady Blessed Mary", served for four hundred years and was the principal place of worship despite being outside the walled town. Writing in 1546, the historian John Leland confirmed the 12th century rebuilding of the ancient church of St. Mary.

Shortly after Leland's visit to Southampton, the church was destroyed, probably as a punitive measure against the rector, Dr. William Capon, because of his disagreement with a decision by government commissioners to confiscate the Chantry lands. The interior of the church, including woodwork and marble tombs, was demolished, the bells removed and the steeple weakened so that it later had to be taken down.

The Court Leet of 30 April 1549 ordered that "so much of the rubbish of St. Mary's Church should be carted away as would serve to make the highway from Bargate and all East Street down to the turning of the Chantry"; all that remained was the chancel.

Third church
In October 1551, the church, chantry, glebe lands and tithes were all leased out to a merchant and ship-owner, Robert Reniger, at one time Sheriff of Southampton. One condition of the lease, which later passed to the Lambert family, was that the Rector of St. Mary's should receive eighteen pounds a year from the income of the lands.

From time to time the Lambert family paid towards the repair of the chancel, where services were still held. However, after the Civil War, during which all the tithes and properties of St. Mary's had been sequestrated and handed over to the Corporation, it is recorded that the "chapel" or church of St. Mary's was "much in decay". The town authorised the under-tenant at that time, a Mr. Barber, to get the chapel repaired, and he would be reimbursed from the rent he paid for the lands "provided always he does not disburse above  shillings". Unsurprisingly, the little church continued to be in a sad state.

After the Restoration, the leases were returned to the church of St. Mary and by 1662, Doctor Clutterbuck, the rector, was in possession of the church and its lands.

Fourth church
In 1711, Archdeacon Brideoak instigated the building of a new church by adding a nave at a cost of £920, but eventually in 1723 the chancel was also rebuilt (for £400).

In the eighteenth century, St. Mary's was well outside the built-up area around the walled town to the east, but following the rapid growth and spread of the town around 1800, the church had been much enlarged with aisles and galleries, during the time when Francis North was rector, who had the church re-consecrated in 1833.

In 1850, Philip Brannon wrote in his Picture of Southampton: It has been recently enlarged by the addition of two wings; and is now in tolerable repair, but more remarkable for its bold defiance of all architectural propriety, than for any other characteristic: tall clustered columns being carried from the floor to support a horizontal beam or entablature close to the ceiling, whilst plain round windows contrast the pointed arch of the ancient chancel.By the 1870s, the poor construction of the 1833 church alterations revealed considerable deterioration, and in the 1870s Bishop Samuel Wilberforce sought advice from the eminent architect G. E. Street, who condemned the building.

Fifth church
On the death of the bishop in 1873, the subsequent re-building under the rectorship of his son, Canon Basil Wilberforce, was destined to become his memorial. In August 1878, the Prince of Wales (later King Edward VII) laid the dedication stone, and the new church was consecrated in June 1879 and completed in 1884, with the exception of the tower and spire which were finished in 1912–1914, incorporating eight bells, with two more being added in 1934.

During the blitz of 30 November 1940, incendiary bombs destroyed the church leaving a damaged tower, bells and baptistery. At the end of the War, Canon Spencer Leeson and the church council took the decision to restore the bells—"thus giving encouragement and visible witness of the determination to rebuild once again", with the work being completed by June 1948.

The decision to complete the rebuilding of the entire church was not made until the early 1950s. The town was in ruins and this was not deemed to be a priority as worship was being maintained in the nearby Chantry Hall. An offer from the town council to allocate a new site for a town church in East Park Terrace had been turned down in 1946 as the diocese had reservations about the viability of such a large building, and money was being directed towards the construction of new churches in growing outlying areas of the town.

Sixth church

The rebuilding of the sixth church was finally begun in February 1954 and completed and consecrated in June 1956. The new church was built by Romilly Craze, who retained Street's 200 ft high steeple, the general ground plan and some of the outside walls, made of Purbeck stone (with the interior of Bath stone), with a fine new west window designed by Gerald Smith, depicting six local landmarks.

In their 1967 Architectural Guide to Hampshire & The Isle of Wight, Pevsner and Lloyd were rather scathing about the main building and what they saw as a squandered opportunity "to build a new mother church worthy of a great city which had played such a significant part in the war in which it had so much suffered". They praised Street's tower and spire as making externally "a splendid composition, one of the finest Victorian steeples in England ... wonderfully impressive when seen from a medium distance".

Interior

The main entrance door is on the west front; on entering the church you can see straight ahead all the way to the chancel and the high altar, with the nave altar and the chancel steps in between.

On the left is an archway which leads to the small baptistery, which is the oldest part of the present church and largely survived the bombing in 1940. It is currently used for small services and for private prayer. The nave is large, with two side aisles, and is also used for art exhibitions. At the head of the nave is the nave altar, backed by the steps into the chancel, containing the choir stalls, with the organ console above them on the left, and most of the pipes on the right. At the far east end is the sanctuary with the high altar enclosed by altar rails. The transepts are level with the nave altar, and the north transept also houses the Seafarers' Chapel, commemorating the seafaring history of the port of Southampton. At the entrance to the chapel are hung the house flags of many of the shipping companies that used the port. A ship's binnacle serves as a lectern. The chapel window was designed by Gerald E. R. Smith of London who also designed the great west window and the east window.

The window was designed by Louise Hemmings and features an angel rising from the waves in a cloud of bubbles, one bubble for each member of the crew.

St Mary's reopened in September 2018, rebranded as Saint Mary’s, and becoming part of the Holy Trinity Brompton (HTB) family of churches. With extensive work being done on toilets, roofs, floors, staging, lighting, sound and power, along with glass walls for the bell tower. It also now has a kitchen/cafe inside. The church is led by Jon & Hannah Finch.

Bells
A ring of eight bells was first installed in 1914. Cast at John Taylor's Foundry in Loughborough, they were given by Mary Ann Wingrove in memory of her late husband, Robert, in 1913, and brought to St. Mary's from Southampton Docks railway station in a horse-drawn procession. A further two bells were added in 1934.

In 1914, Australian composer A. Emmett Adams and British lyricist Douglas Furber were in Southampton when they heard the recently installed bells ringing across the town, inspiring them to write the song, "The Bells of St. Mary's". The song was later made famous by Bing Crosby in the film of the same name and has since been recorded by many other artistes.

Following the destruction of much of the church in November 1940, the damaged bells were taken away for safe-keeping. However, ten new bells were recast from the metal of the originals in 1945, again by Taylor's, and rang again in 1948.

Organ
The organ in St. Mary's Church, is among the largest church organs in the south of England. The instrument was built by Henry Willis & Sons, and designed in consultation with D. Cecil Williams, organist at the church. It was completed in 1956 and incorporates some "Father Willis" pipework from the former Albert Hall organ in Stirling.

This is a major and impressive instrument in the Willis III tradition. It has remained virtually unaltered since 1956, though the Great, Choir and Pedal organs were overhauled following a roof leak in 1994. The electrics are completely original although at least two stops, the Gedackt and the Cymbel Mixture, are replacement stops, for a Clarabella and a Vox Humana, respectively.

Southampton St. Mary's Football Club
In 1880, the St. Mary's church football team, founded by the church curate, Rev. Arthur Baron Sole, began playing on the Deanery field, behind the present vicarage. By November 1885, the Deanery club had folded and a new club was founded by members of the St. Mary's Church of England Young Men's Association playing as "St. Mary's Young Men's Association F.C."; this became simply "St. Mary's F.C." in 1887–88, before adopting the name "Southampton St. Mary's F.C." when the club joined the Southern League in 1894. After they won the Southern League title in 1896–97, the club became a limited company and changed their name to "Southampton F.C." which has maintained its ecclesiastical connection via its nick-name "The Saints".

From 1887 to 1896, the church was the club's landlord, being the owners of their first permanent home at the Antelope Ground, situated at the northern end of St. Mary's Road.

References

External links
Seven page article about the organ (October 1957) by the late Dr. William Sumner 
History of the bells 
Leland's Southampton 1535–43
St. Mary's on Hampshire Churches website
St. Mary's on Hampshire Church windows website

Churches in Southampton
Church of England church buildings in Hampshire
Grade II listed churches in Hampshire
Southampton F.C.
History of Southampton
Southampton